The Clinton County Courthouse Complex is a historic county government and courthouse site located at 135 Margaret Street in Plattsburgh, Clinton County, New York. The main courthouse was constructed in 1889.  It is a two-story, ashlar stone and brick Richardsonian Romanesque style building.  It has a hipped roof and rock-faced arched openings. It features a large, square central tower with an open campanile and pyramidal roof. The associated Surrogate's Building was built in 1884–1885, and is a two-story, Italianate style brick building with a bracketed cornice with Renaissance style detail.

The courthouse complex was added to the National Register of Historic Places on November 12, 1982.

See also
List of Registered Historic Places in Clinton County, New York

References

County courthouses in New York (state)
Courthouses on the National Register of Historic Places in New York (state)
Italianate architecture in New York (state)
Richardsonian Romanesque architecture in New York (state)
Renaissance Revival architecture in New York (state)
Government buildings completed in 1889
Buildings and structures in Clinton County, New York
National Register of Historic Places in Clinton County, New York